Matukar (also called Matukar Panau) is an Austronesian language spoken by about 400 people near Madang town, Madang Province, Papua New Guinea.  It is universally spoken by its ethnic group.

References

External links
 Matukar Talking Dictionary from Living Tongues Institute for Endangered Languages and Swarthmore College

Languages of Madang Province
Bel languages